Ladislas Orsy (born July 30, 1921) is a canonical theologian.

Early life
Father Orsy was born on July 30, 1921 in Hungary. He entered Society of Jesus, Budapest (Hungary) in 1943 and was ordained in 1951 at Leuven (Belgium).

Education
Orsy earned a licentiate in philosophy at the Gregorian University, Rome in 1948 followed by a licentiate in Theology at the Jesuit College at the Catholic University of Leuven in 1952. Five years later he obtained his doctorate in Canon Law at the Gregorian University. In 1960 he earned a MA degree in civil law from Honours School of Jurisprudence at Oxford University.

Writing career
Orsy has written hundreds of journal articles and nine books on theology and canon law. His books include Marriage in Canon Law (1986), The Church: Learning and Teaching (1987), Theology and Canon Law: New Horizons for Legislation and Interpretation (1992).

Teaching career
Orsy was formerly a professor of Canon Law at The Catholic University of America School of Canon Law. He has taught Canon Law at the Gregorian University in Rome, Fordham University, the University of Fribourg, Switzerland, Saint Paul University, Ottawa, [Canada], and the Georgetown University Law Center.  He is a regular visitor at the Georgetown University Law Center where he teaches Roman Law, Philosophy of Law, Canon Law, and Great Philosophers on Law.

In 1999, Orsy dialogued with then-Cardinal Joseph Ratzinger about the Apostolic letter Ad Tuendam Fidem.

References

Hungarian Roman Catholic theologians
Canonical theologians
Living people
20th-century Hungarian Jesuits
Catholic University of America School of Canon Law faculty
1921 births